Lord Gordon may refer to the following British titles or people:
 Lord Gordon of Badenoch
 Lord Gordon of Strathblane (19362020), or known as James Gordon, Baron Gordon of Strathblane: a British life peer, Scottish businessman and manager
 Lord Gordon of Drumearn, or known as Edward Gordon, Baron Gordon of Drumearn (181479), Scottish politician and judge
Lord Gordon-Gordon (74) 
Lord George Gordon (175193)
Lord Nicholas Gordon-Lennox (19312004)
Lord Douglas Gordon (185188)

See also
Gordon Lord